Syed Farooq Azeem Hasan (born 17 October 1941), also known as FA Hassan, SFA Hasan, is a Pakistani barrister and former first-class cricketer.

References

External links

1941 births
Living people
People from Lahore
Aitchison College alumni
University of the Punjab alumni
Pakistani cricketers
Pakistan Universities cricketers
Punjab University cricketers
Alumni of Jesus College, Oxford
Oxford University cricketers
Alumni of Magdalene College, Cambridge
Members of Lincoln's Inn
Pakistani emigrants to the United States
Harvard Fellows